Blagovo may refer to:

 In Bulgaria (written in Cyrillic as Благово):
 Blagovo, Montana Province - a village in Montana municipality, Montana Province
 Blagovo, Shumen Province - a village in Shumen municipality, Shumen Province